Steve Staios (born July 28, 1973)  is a Canadian former professional ice hockey player who has played both right wing and defence in the National Hockey League (NHL). Staios played with the Boston Bruins, Vancouver Canucks, Atlanta Thrashers, Edmonton Oilers, Calgary Flames, and New York Islanders during his career. He currently serves as president for the Hamilton Bulldogs.

Playing career
As a youth, Staios played in the 1987 Quebec International Pee-Wee Hockey Tournament with a minor ice hockey team from Hamilton West.

Staios was selected in the second round of the 1991 NHL Entry Draft, 27th overall, by the St. Louis Blues. After a three-year career in the Ontario Hockey League (OHL) with the Niagara Falls Thunder and Sudbury Wolves, Staios spent several years in the International Hockey League (IHL) and the American Hockey League (AHL) with the Blues' minor league affiliates.   He was traded to the Boston Bruins on March 8, 1996, along with Kevin Sawyer for Stephen Leach.  Staios made his NHL debut with the Bruins, appearing in 12 games to finish the 1995–96 season. The following season, in 1996–97, he was acquired on waivers by the Vancouver Canucks on March 18, 1997.  He finished what qualified as his NHL rookie season with a combined 17 points in 63 games between the two teams.

After two more seasons with the Canucks thereafter, Staios was left unprotected for the 1999 NHL Expansion Draft and was selected by the Atlanta Thrashers. He changed his position to right wing, but was often sidelined in his first season with Atlanta, appearing in just 27 games due to a knee injury suffered in a game against the Colorado Avalanche on October 23, 1999. The following season, Staios was named team captain, succeeding Kelly Buchberger for the 2000–01. He recorded 22 points in 70 games in his final year as a Thrasher.

In the 2001 off-season, Staios signed as an unrestricted free agent with the Edmonton Oilers on July 12, 2001.  In 2002–03, he led all defenceman in shorthanded goals (3).  After the 2004–05 NHL lockout, during which time Staios played briefly with Luleå HF of the Swedish Elitserien, Staios was part of the Oilers team that made a run to the 2006 Stanley Cup Finals. He scored one goal and five assists in a career-high 24 playoff games; however, the Oilers lost in game seven of the finals to the Carolina Hurricanes.  He had notably taken a penalty in overtime during game five of the finals, an elimination game for the Oilers.  However, Fernando Pisani scored shorthanded to force a game six.

An injury shortened 2006-07 season saw Staios play in only 58 games, scoring two goals. He managed to stay healthy the next two seasons, playing in all 82 games during the 2007-08 campaign and in 80 games during the 2008-09 campaign, recording a combined 30 points.

Staios was sidelined for a month, early in the 2009–10, suffering a concussion on October 6, 2009.

On March 3, 2010, Staios was traded to the Calgary Flames from the Edmonton Oilers in exchange for Aaron Johnson and a third round draft pick in 2011. It was the first trade between the franchises in their histories. He ultimately missed the majority of 2010-11 due to a recurring upper body injury.

On September 30, 2011, Staios signed as an unrestricted free agent with the New York Islanders On April 5, 2012 Staios played in his 1000th NHL game.

Staios announced his retirement as a player following the 2011-12 season, and on July 25, 2012, was hired as a player development adviser for the NHL's Toronto Maple Leafs. After Randy Carlyle was fired, Staios went on the bench to act as an assistant coach to interim coach Peter Horachek.

Personal
Staios was born to Macedonian parents. He has two children, Nathan and Ella, with his wife, Susannah.

His son, Nathan Staios, was selected 17th overall in the first round of the 2017 OHL Entry Draft by the Windsor Spitfires.

Career statistics

Regular season and playoffs

International

Transactions
Traded to Boston Bruins by St. Louis Blues with Kevin Sawyer for Steve Leach, March 8, 1996. 
Claimed on waivers by Vancouver Canucks from Boston Bruins, March 18, 1997. 
Claimed by Atlanta Thrashers from Vancouver Canucks in Expansion Draft, June 25, 1999.
Traded to New Jersey Devils by Atlanta Thrashers for New Jersey's 9th round choice (Simon Gamache) in 2000 Entry Draft, June 12, 2000. 
Traded to Atlanta Thrashers by New Jersey for future considerations, July 10, 2000. 
Signed as a free agent by Edmonton Oilers, July 12, 2001. 
Signed as a free agent by Lulea (Sweden), January 28, 2005. 
Traded to Calgary Flames by Edmonton Oilers for Aaron Johnson and Calgary's 3rd round choice (Travis Ewanyk) in 2011 Entry Draft, March 3, 2010.

Coaching record

Ontario Hockey League

See also
List of NHL players with 1000 games played

References

External links
Staios' Website

1973 births
Living people
Atlanta Thrashers captains
Atlanta Thrashers players
Boston Bruins players
Calgary Flames players
Canadian expatriate sportspeople in Finland
Canadian ice hockey defencemen
Canadian people of Macedonian descent 
Edmonton Oilers players
Ice hockey people from Ontario
Luleå HF players
New York Islanders players
Niagara Falls Thunder players
Peoria Rivermen (IHL) players
Providence Bruins players
St. Louis Blues draft picks
Sportspeople from Hamilton, Ontario
Sudbury Wolves players
Toronto Maple Leafs personnel
Vancouver Canucks players
Worcester IceCats players
Canadian expatriate ice hockey players in Sweden